These Foolish Things is a 2006 British romantic drama film directed by Julia Taylor-Stanley and starring Zoë Tapper, David Leon, Lauren Bacall, Anjelica Huston, Terence Stamp, Andrew Lincoln, Eve Myles, Jamie Glover and Julia McKenzie. It is based on Noel Langley's 1936 novel There's a Porpoise Close Behind Us.

Premise
Set in 1930s England, a struggling young actress, a fledgling director and an ambitious playwright become embroiled in an emotional love triangle as they strive for recognition, fame and fortune in a world on the brink of World War II.

Cast
Zoë Tapper as Diana Shaw
Anjelica Huston as Lottie Osgood
David Leon as Robin Gardner
Lauren Bacall as Dame Lydia
Terence Stamp as Baker
Andrew Lincoln as Christopher Lovell
Eve Myles as Dolly Nightingale
Jamie Glover as Everard
Julia McKenzie as Miss Abernethy

Production
The drama was largely filmed on location in Bristol, Cheltenham and surrounding areas of Gloucestershire.

Reception
The film received generally poor ratings. In a 2006 review for The Guardian Philip French called the movie "a turgid romantic comedy" and an "embarrassing affair" A review for BBC called it "A romance so old-fashioned that audiences will be checking not just their watches but their calendars, These Foolish Things is a well made but achingly square drama."

References

External links
 

2006 films
2006 romantic drama films
British romantic drama films
Films set in England
Films set in the 1930s
Films shot in Gloucestershire
2000s English-language films
2000s British films